Harry Knoles (1880-1936) was a British film director of the silent era.

Selected filmography
 The Greater Will (1915)
 The Master Hand (1915)
 Bought and Paid For (1916)
 His Brother's Wife (1916)
 The Devil's Toy (1916)
 The Volunteer (1917)
 The Stolen Paradise (1917)
 The Price of Pride (1917)
Adventures of Carol (1917)
 The Little Duchess (1917)
 A Square Deal (1917)
 The Burglar (1917)
 Souls Adrift (1917)
The Page Mystery (1917)
 The Social Leper (1917)
 Bolshevism on Trial (1919)
 Guilty of Love (1920)
 Half an Hour (1920)
 A Romantic Adventuress (1920)
 The Great Shadow (1920)
 Carnival (1921)
 The Bohemian Girl (1922)
 Lew Tyler's Wives (1926)
 The White Sheik (1928)
 The Rising Generation (1928)
 Irish Hearts (1934)

References

External links

1880 births
1936 deaths
British film directors
People from Rotherham
20th-century British screenwriters